Narnack Records is an independent record label founded in 2000. The label developed in New York City's underground music scene and quickly became known for its ability for developing new artists Coachwhips, OCS, Langhorne Slim, Thee Oh sees, ACID, Spiders & Hearts, Higgs, while also working with established bands like the Fall and the Slits, Lee "Scratch" Perry Narnack became home for a diversified group of musicians working with a wide variety of artists, from garage rock, alternative and punk to Americana, folk and dub/reggae.

In the spring of 2007, the company relocated from New York to Los Angeles, where it teamed up with Lionsgate Films for distribution. In its new residence, Narnack began a publishing division, Narnack Music Publishing, with a catalog of over 300 songs from past and present artists as well as composers. After a short stint with Lionsgate, Narnack moved to TVT/The Orchard for both physical and digital distribution.

In 2008, Lee "Scratch" Perry brought Narnack a Grammy nomination for Best Reggae Album with Repentance.

Current roster
400 Blows
Electric Flower Group
Hypernova
Iran
Lee "Scratch" Perry
Garrett Pierce
Restavrant
Sisters
Sundelles
Vaz

Catalog artists
Big A Little a
Tyondai Braxton
Bunnybrains
The Cairo Gang
Coachwhips
Condor
Deerhoof
DJ Shitbird and the Ultimate Party Machine
Erase Errata
The Fall
Friends Forever
Friends of Dean Martinez
Guitar Wolf
Hella
Intelligence
Langhorne Slim
Lil Pocketknife
The Oh Sees 
Parts & Labor
Revenge SF
Shesus
Sonic Youth
The Slits
Women And Children
XBXRX
X27
Yellow Swans
Young People

References

External links
Official site

See also
List of record labels

American independent record labels